The 2022 Wellington local elections were held on 8 October 2022 as part of the wider 2022 New Zealand local elections to elect members to sub-national councils and boards. The Wellington elections cover one regional council (the Greater Wellington Regional Council), eight territorial authorities (city and district councils), and various community boards and licensing trusts.

Greater Wellington Regional Council 
The Greater Wellington Regional Council used the single transferable vote system to elect thirteen regional councillors for the 2022-2025 term.

Kāpiti Coast constituency
The Kāpiti Coast constituency returned one councillor to the regional council.

Incumbent candidate

Pōneke/Wellington constituency 
The Pōneke/Wellington constituency returned five councillors to the regional council.

Incumbent candidate

Porirua-Tawa constituency
The Porirua-Tawa constituency returned two councillors to the regional council.

Incumbent candidate

Te Awa Kairangi ki Tai/Lower Hutt constituency
The Te Awa Kairangi ki Tai/Lower Hutt constituency returned three councillors to the regional council.

Incumbent candidate

Te Awa Kairangi ki Uta/Upper Hutt constituency
The Te Awa Kairangi ki Uta/Upper Hutt constituency returned one councillor to the regional council.

Incumbent candidate

Wairarapa constituency
The Wairarapa constituency returned one councillor to the regional council. Adrienne Staples was re-elected unopposed.

Wellington City Council 
The Wellington City Council used the single transferable vote system to elect the Mayor of Wellington and city councillors for the 2022-2025 term. Voter turnout was 43.27%.

Incumbents not seeking re-election
Incumbent Independent councillors Simon Woolf and Jill Day did not run again in the Wharangi/Onslow-Western and Takapū/Northern wards, respectively. Labour councillor Fleur Fitzsimons did not seek re-election in the Paekawakawa/Southern ward.

Mayor 

Nine candidates announced that they would run for mayor, including incumbent Andy Foster. Tory Whanau was endorsed by the Green Party, and Paul Eagle was endorsed by the Labour Party.

Incumbent candidate

Motukairangi/Eastern General ward 
The Motukairangi/Eastern General ward returned three councillors to the city council.

Incumbent councillor Sarah Free ran as a Green candidate in previous elections, but announced in December 2021 that she would run as an independent in 2022.

Incumbent candidate

Paekawakawa/Southern General ward 
The Paekawakawa/Southern General ward returned two councillors to the city council.

Incumbent candidate

Pukehīnau/Lambton General ward 
The Pukehīnau/Lambton General ward returned three councillors to the city council.

Incumbent Green Party councillor since 2007 Iona Pannett, who received the most votes in Pukehīnau Lambton Ward in 2019, was not reselected by the Green Party in April 2022, and ran as an independent. Incumbent councillor Tamatha Paul was elected as an independent in 2019, but in May 2022 announced she would seek the Green nomination, which she received in June.

Incumbent candidate

Takapū/Northern General ward 
The Takapū/Northern General ward returned three councillors to the city council.

Incumbent candidate

Wharangi/Onslow-Western General ward 
The Wharangi/Onslow-Western General ward returned three councillors to the city council.

Incumbent candidate

Te Whanganui-a-Tara Māori ward 
Te Whanganui a Tara is a Māori ward created by Wellington City Council in 2021. The 2022 election returned Nīkau Wi-Neera as its first-ever councillor.

Overall Wellington City Council results
Following the 2022 Wellington local election, councillors affiliated with the Labour and Green parties gained control over the three major committees in the Wellington City Council.  Following a month of negotiations and restructuring, Mayor of Wellington Tory Whanau had reduced the number of full council committees from five to three. Labour councillor Rebecca Matthews began chair of the committee in charge of long term-planning, finance and performance. Labour councillors Teri O'Neill and Nureddin Abdurahman became the chair and deputy chair social, cultural, and economic council committee. In addition, Green councillor Tamatha Paul became chair of the new environment and infrastructure committee.

Other local elections
Depending on where in Wellington they lived, voters also voted in concurrent local elections for the:
Tawa Community Board;
Mākara / Ōhāriu Community Board; and/or
Hutt Mana Charitable Trust (in the northern Wellington suburbs of Johnsonville, Newlands, Broadmeadows and Tawa).

Porirua City Council
The Porirua City Council established boundaries for three new wards, two general wards and one Māori ward, to be contested for the first time in the 2022 local elections. The Porirua City Council used the single transferable vote system to elect the Mayor of Porirua and city councillors for the 2022-2025 term. The positions of mayor and ten city councillors were contested by the following candidates:

Mayor

Incumbent candidate

Onepoto general ward
The Onepoto ward returned five councillors to the city council.

Incumbent candidate

Pāuatahanui general ward
The Pāuatahanui ward returned four councillors to the city council. 

Incumbent candidate

Parirua Māori ward
The Parirua Māori ward returned one councillor to the city council.

Incumbent candidate

Other local elections
Porirua voters also voted in concurrent local elections for the Hutt Mana Charitable Trust.

Hutt City Council
Each ward of the Hutt City Council returned one councillor to the city council, with six further councillors elected at-large. The Hutt City Council used the first-past-the-post system to elect the Mayor of Lower Hutt and city councillors for the 2022-2025 term. Voter turnout was 40.24%. The positions of mayor and twelve city councillors were contested by the following candidates:

Mayor
Two candidates unsuccessfully challenged the incumbent Campbell Barry for the mayoralty of Lower Hutt.

Incumbent candidate

Central Ward
There was one vacancy for the Central ward.

Incumbent candidate

Eastern Ward
There was one vacancy for the Eastern ward.

Incumbent candidate

Harbour Ward
There was one vacancy for the Harbour ward.

Incumbent candidate

Northern Ward
There was one vacancy for the Northern ward.

Incumbent candidate

Wainuiomata Ward
There was one vacancy for the Wainuiomata ward.

Incumbent candidate

Western Ward
There was one vacancy for the Western ward.

Council at-large
There were six vacancies for citywide (at-large) councillors.

Incumbent candidate

Electoral system referendum
In 2021 the Hutt City Council resolved to conduct a referendum for which electoral system to use in the 2025 and 2028 local elections. The referendum asked voters to choose between the First Past the Post and Single Transferable Voting electoral systems.

Other local elections
Depending on where in Lower Hutt they lived, voters also voted in concurrent local elections for the:
Eastbourne Community Board;
Petone Community Board;
Wainuiomata Community Board; and/or
Hutt Mana Charitable Trust.

Upper Hutt City Council
The Upper Hutt City Council used the first-past-the-post system to elect the Mayor of Upper Hutt and city councillors for the 2022-2025 term. Voter turnout was 43.15%. The positions of mayor and ten city councillors elected at-large were contested by the following candidates:

Mayor
There was one vacancy for the mayoralty of Upper Hutt. The incumbent since 2001 has been Wayne Guppy.

Incumbent candidate

Council at-large
There were ten vacancies for the Upper Hutt City Council, elected at-large.

Incumbent candidate

Other local elections
Upper Hutt voters also voted in concurrent local elections for the: 
Hutt Mana Charitable Trust; and
Rimutaka Licensing Trust.

Kapiti Coast District Council
The Kapiti Coast District Council used the single transferable vote system to elect the Mayor of Kapiti Coast and district councillors for the 2022-2025 term. The positions of mayor and ten district councillors were contested by the following candidates:

Mayor
Incumbent mayor K Gurunathan chose not to stand for re-election.

Ōtaki Ward
The Ōtaki ward returned one councillor to the district council.

Waikanae Ward
The Waikanae ward returned two councillors to the district council.

Incumbent candidate

Paraparaumu Ward
The Paraparaumu ward returned three councillors to the district council.

Incumbent candidate

Paekākāriki–Raumati Ward
The Paekākāriki–Raumati ward returned one councillor to the district council.

Incumbent candidate

Council at-large
Three councillors were returned to the district council by the district at-large, from a field of nine candidates.

Incumbent candidate

Other local elections
Depending on where in the Kapiti Coast District they lived, voters also voted in concurrent local elections for the:
Ōtaki Community Board;
Paekākāriki Community Board;
Paraparaumu Community Board;
Raumati Community Board (newly created); or
Waikanae Community Board.

Masterton District Council
In May 2021 the Masterton District Council voted to establish a Māori ward for the council, and as part of their representation review reduced the number of councillors from ten to eight. The Masterton District Council used the first-past-the-post system to elect the Mayor of Masterton and district councillors for the 2022-2025 term. Voter turnout was 46.68%. The positions of mayor and eight district councillors were contested by the following candidates:

Mayor
Incumbent mayor Lyn Patterson chose not to stand for re-election.

Masterton/Whakaoriori general ward
The Masterton/Whakaoriori general ward returned four councillors to the district council.

Withdrawn due to being elected as mayor
Incumbent candidate

Masterton/Whakaoriori Māori ward
The Masterton/Whakaoriori Māori ward returned one councillor to the district council. Marama Tuuta was elected unopposed.

Council at-large
Three councillors were returned to the district council by the district at-large.

Incumbent candidate

Other local elections
Masterton voters also be voted in concurrent local elections for the:
Masterton Community Trust;
Masterton Trust Lands Trust; and
Montfort Trimble Foundation.

Carterton District Council
The Carterton District Council used the first-past-the-post system to elect the Mayor of Carterton and district councillors for the 2022-2025 term. Voter turnout was 59.06%. The positions of mayor and eight district councillors elected at-large were contested by the following candidates:

Mayor
There was one vacancy for the mayoralty of Carterton. The incumbent Greg Lang stood for re-election, with Ron Mark, former Carterton mayor (2010–2014) and New Zealand First MP (1996–2008 and 2014–2020), standing against him.

Incumbent candidate

Council at-large

Incumbent candidate

South Wairarapa District Council
The South Wairarapa District Council used the first-past-the-post system to elect the Mayor of South Wairarapa and district councillors for the 2022-2025 term. The positions of mayor and nine district councillors were contested by the following candidates:

Mayor
There was one vacancy for the mayoralty of South Wairarapa. Incumbent mayor Alex Beijen stood for re-election.

Incumbent candidate

Featherston ward
The Featherston ward returned three councillors to the district council.

Incumbent candidate

Greytown ward
The Greytown ward returned three councillors to the district council.

Incumbent candidate

Martinborough ward
The Martinborough ward returned three councillors to the district council.

Incumbent candidate

Other local elections
Depending on where in the South Wairarapa District they lived, voters also voted in concurrent local elections for the:
Featherston Community Board;
Greytown Community Board;
Martinborough Community Board; and/or
Greytown District Trust Lands Trust.

References 

Wellington
Politics of the Wellington Region
Wellington
2020s in Wellington